Betapsestis umbrosa is a moth in the family Drepanidae. It was described by Wileman in 1911. It is found in Japan.

References

Moths described in 1911
Thyatirinae